The Journal of the Society of Christian Ethics is a biannual peer-reviewed academic journal, sponsored by the Society of Christian Ethics, that examines social, economic, political, and cultural problems within the context of Christian social ethics. It was established in 1981 as The Annual of the Society of Christian Ethics and was reorganized as a journal in 2002. For many years, the journal was published by Georgetown University Press. Since 2019 it has been published in print and electronic formats by the Philosophy Documentation Center.

Abstracting and indexing
The journal is abstracted and indexed in the following bibliographic databases:

See also 
 List of ethics journals

References

External links 
 
 The Society of Christian Ethics

English-language journals
Ethics journals
Publications established in 1981
Biannual journals
Philosophy Documentation Center academic journals
Georgetown University Press books